A skate magazine or skateboarding magazine is a publication whose main topic is skateboarding. They can be in print form, online, or both.

References

Skateboarding companies
Magazines by discipline
Skateboarding magazines